is a Japanese footballer currently playing as a defender for FC Tokyo.

International career
In March 2021, Osako was called up to the Japan under-18 squad for the first time.

Career statistics

Club
.

Notes

References

External links

2003 births
Living people
Japanese footballers
Japan youth international footballers
Association football defenders
J3 League players
FC Tokyo players
FC Tokyo U-23 players